Seacrest Country Day School is a private school in Naples, Florida that educates students from Preschool through 12th grade. Founded in 1983 by Dr. Jane Kern, Seacrest is a college-preparatory, co-educational independent school that, according to its mission, "fuels intellectual engagement, teaches ownership of the educational experience, cultivates quality of character, and inspires students to lead lives of significance."

The school is accredited by the National Association of Independent Schools, the Southern Association of Independent Schools, the Southern Association of Colleges and Schools, and the Florida Council of Independent Schools. It is also a founding member school of the Independent Curriculum Group, a "learning community of engaged academic leaders and schools working to promote the transformation of teaching and learning."

Sports

Fall 

 Cross Country
 Golf
 Volleyball
 Swimming and Diving

Winter 

 Basketball
 Soccer

Spring 

 Baseball
 Softball
 Track and Field
 Tennis

Coaches 
Baseball:

References

External links
Seacrest Country Day School website
National Association of Independent Schools

Schools in Florida
Schools in Collier County, Florida
1983 establishments in Florida
Educational institutions established in 1983